UFC 228: Woodley vs. Till was a mixed martial arts event produced by the Ultimate Fighting Championship that was held on September 8, 2018 at American Airlines Center in Dallas, Texas.

Background
The event was headlined by a UFC Welterweight Championship bout between then current champion Tyron Woodley and Darren Till. Due to a nasal issue that required surgery, the interim champion Colby Covington was not available for this event. He was also expected to be stripped of his title as soon as the Woodley/Till bout took place. The Ultimate Fighter: American Top Team vs. Blackzilians welterweight winner Kamaru Usman submitted medicals and weighed in as an official replacement for the bout.

A UFC Women's Flyweight Championship bout between then champion Nicco Montaño and former UFC Women's Bantamweight Championship title challenger Valentina Shevchenko was expected to take place at the event, as the co-headliner. However, before the weigh-ins, Montaño was transported to a hospital due to the effects of weight cutting and the title bout with Shevchenko was cancelled. Later that day, UFC president  Dana White announced that Montaño was stripped of the title and that Shevchenko will fight for the vacant belt "as soon as she's able". 

A featherweight bout between The Ultimate Fighter: Latin America featherweight winner Yair Rodríguez and Zabit Magomedsharipov was scheduled for the event. However, Rodríguez pulled out of the fight on August 23 citing injury. He was replaced by Brandon Davis.

Ryan Benoit was scheduled to face Roberto Sanchez at the event. However, Benoit pulled out of the fight in late August for undisclosed reasons and was replaced by Jarred Brooks.

Results

Bonus awards
The following fighters received $50,000 bonuses:
Fight of the Night: Irene Aldana vs. Lucie Pudilová
Performance of the Night: Tyron Woodley and Jéssica Andrade

See also
2018 in UFC
List of UFC events
List of current UFC fighters

References

Ultimate Fighting Championship events
Mixed martial arts in Dallas
Sports competitions in Dallas
2018 in mixed martial arts
2018 in sports in Texas
September 2018 sports events in the United States